Isofraxidin-7-glucoside (calycanthoside) is a constituent of Eleutherococcus senticosus that is classified as a coumarin.  It is a glucoside of isofraxidin.

References

Coumarins
Glucosides
Methoxy compounds